Braddock is an unincorporated community in Coulee Rural Municipality No. 136, Saskatchewan, Canada.

See also 
 List of communities in Saskatchewan

References 

Coulee No. 136, Saskatchewan
Unincorporated communities in Saskatchewan